David Obst is an American literary agent and author. Obst was the agent of Carl Bernstein and Bob Woodward. He also was involved in the productions of the films Revenge of the Nerds, Fast Times at Ridgemont High, and All the President's Men.

Early life 
According to Alex Kyczynski of The New York Times, Obst says he was born in 1946,  in Culver City, California. He attended the University of California, Berkeley.

Career

Around 1969 Obst went to Taiwan to study the Chinese language and later moved to Washington, DC where he became Seymour Hersh's literary agent. Obst had also associated with activist Abbie Hoffman. Obst wrote the memoir "Too Good To Be Forgotten: Changing America in the '60s and '70s", which was published in 1998. In a review of the book, Hersh stated that Obst was "in the middle of" important political movements in the 1960s and 1970s. By 1977 Obst had about 50 clients.

On 1 February 1977 an article was published in the New York Magazine by Matthew Klein, stating that "David Obst, superagent, becomes David Obst, publisher, with a family attachment to random house. Obst stated that he had less success as a publisher compared to being an agent. He did however publish a series of books called Roadfood, a guide to highway restaurants.

In 1998 Obst further explained the idea Deep Throat was non-existent in a New York Times interview. This was originally revealed in Too Good To Be Forgotten

Personal life
Obst married and later divorced Lynda Obst. As of 1998 he lived in Santa Barbara, California.

Publications
 Too Good to Be Forgotten

References

Living people
American writers
People from Santa Barbara, California
University of California, Berkeley alumni
1946 births